The Miss International pageant is part of the Big Four international beauty pageants and is established in 1960, with the first edition being held at Long Beach, California, United States, the same venue where the first edition of the Miss Universe pageant was staged in 1952 (until 1959 when it moved to Miami Beach, Florida, due to this establishment) and now currently is located in Japan. In the entire 53-year history of the pageant, The first winner of Miss International 2012, Ikumi Yoshimatsu of Japan was dethroned and did not crown her successor due to contract dispute with another talent agency but was not replaced.

Winners
From 1960 to 1965, 1967–1979, 2008, and 2011–2019, the pageant has awarded a Top 5 with the Miss International, 1st, 2nd, 3rd, and 4th Runner-Up being awarded. On the other hand, from 1980 to 2007 and 2009–2010, the pageant has awarded a Top 3 with the Miss International, 1st, and 2nd Runner-Up being awarded. Each runner-up was given a sash, plaque/trophy and a crown, apart from the winner (the first to do before it was also done by rival pageant Miss Earth). Only the 1966 and 2020 editions were cancelled.
Here is the list of the top delegates of Miss International, since its inception in 1960. The crowning of the runners-up was to see last year's Top 5 winners from 2016 to 2018.

Since the pageant is based in Japan, to understand carefully, the Japanese ranking for contest is usually as follows:
 第1位 means 1st-Place finisher being designated as Miss International
 第2位 means 2nd-Place finisher being designated as 1st Runner-Up
 第3位 means 3rd-Place finisher being designated as 2nd Runner-Up
 第4位 means 4th-Place finisher being designated as 3rd Runner-Up
 第5位 means 5th-Place finisher being designated as 4th Runner-Up

Countries/Territories by number of Runners-up

1st Runner-Up
The first Runner-Up of each edition of Miss International is the second placer behind the candidate who is crowned as Miss International (first placer).

The current 1st Runner-Up is Stephany Amado from Cape Verde, elected on December 13, 2019 in Tokyo, Japan.

2nd Runner-Up
The second Runner-Up of each edition of Miss International is the third placer behind the candidate who is crowned as Miss International (first placer).

The current 2nd Runner-Up is Tatiana Calmell from Peru, elected on December 13, 2022 in Tokyo, Japan.

3rd Runner-Up
The third Runner-Up of each edition of Miss International is the fourth placer behind the candidate who is crowned as Miss International (first placer). In the years of 1980-2007 and 2009-2010 the titles were not been given.

The current 3rd Runner-Up is Natalia López from Colombia, elected on December 13, 2022 in Tokyo, Japan.

4th Runner-Up
The fourth Runner-Up of each edition of Miss International is the fifth placer behind the candidate who is crowned as Miss International (first placer). In the years of 1980-2007 and 2009-2010 the titles were not been given.

The current 4th Runner-Up is Celinee Santos from the Dominican Republic, elected on December 13, 2022 in Tokyo, Japan.

Continental Queens
Since 2015, Miss International pageant has awarded a Top 5 Continental Queens.

See also
 List of Miss International titleholders
 List of Miss Earth elemental queens
 List of Miss Universe runners-up and finalists
 List of Miss World runners-up and finalists
 Big Four international beauty pageants

References

Miss International
Miss International runners-up and finalists
Miss International runners-up and finalists